John Philip Harding (12 November 1911 – 14 July 1998) was a British zoologist, Keeper of Zoology at the Natural History Museum from 1954 to 1971 and professor at Westfield College, London from 1971 until retirement in 1977.  In 1937 he married Sidnie Manton; they had a daughter Elizabeth (born 1939) and adopted a son.

References

 ‘HARDING, John Philip’, Who Was Who, A & C Black, 1920–2008; online edn, Oxford University Press, Dec 2007 accessed 6 Aug 2011

Academics of Westfield College
Harding, John
Employees of the Natural History Museum, London
1998 deaths
1911 births